This article includes a list of commercial recordings of the Christmas Oratorio (German: „Weihnachtsoratorium“), BWV 248, by Johann Sebastian Bach.

History
The first commercial recording of the Christmas Oratorio appeared in 1950, and new versions have followed regularly. Many recorded versions feature musicians from German-speaking countries, where the oratorio has become standard repertoire. 

The early recordings use larger forces than Bach would have used when the work was premiered with the Thomanerchor in  Leipzig in the years 1734/35. Bach wrote for a boys' choir accompanied by a comparatively small orchestra of Baroque instruments. 

According to Gramophone, Nikolaus Harnoncourt's recording of 1972 was the first to be historically informed.
Since the 1970s many recordings of the Christmas Oratorio have used period instruments with a view to recreating the sounds envisaged by Bach. Sometimes these are antique instruments and sometimes reconstructions such as the oboe da caccia used by Harnoncourt's oboeists.

Choirs with one voice per part (OVPP), used in some historically informed performances of Bach's music, are rarely recorded in this work. There are a couple of interesting examples of the use of smaller choirs by British conductors. John Butt, in a recording made in 2015, chooses two voices per part for some of the choruses. This draws on the researches of Michael Maul into the choir of the Thomasschule.

Guide to table
Recordings of the Christmas Oratorio often credit four soloists, soprano/treble, alto, tenor and bass. Sometimes there are more soloists credited, for example an Evangelist distinct from the tenor soloist, or a second soprano.

The recordings listed in the table below include more than one version by certain conductors (John Eliot Gardiner, Nikolaus Harnoncourt, Helmuth Rilling).

Table of recordings

{| class="wikitable sortable plainrowheaders"
|-
|+ Recordings of the Christmas Oratorio
|-
! scope="col" | Conductor / Choir / Orchestra
! scope="col" class="unsortable" | Soloists
! scope="col" | Label
! scope="col" | Year
! scope="col" | Choir type
! scope="col" | Orch. type
! scope="col" class="unsortable" | Notes
|-

Notes

References 

Discographies of compositions by J. S. Bach